Peter Olofsson (born 10 November 1975) is a retired Swedish football midfielder.

References

1975 births
Living people
Swedish footballers
Umeå FC players
Bryne FK players
GIF Sundsvall players
BK Häcken players
Association football midfielders
Swedish expatriate footballers
Expatriate footballers in Norway
Swedish expatriate sportspeople in Norway
Allsvenskan players
Eliteserien players